Dipienga is a town in the Bilanga Department of Gnagna Province in eastern Burkina Faso. The town has a population of 5,421.

References

External links
Satellite map at Maplandia.com

Populated places in the Est Region (Burkina Faso)
Gnagna Province